Stewart County is a county located in the west central portion of the U.S. state of Georgia. As of the 2020 census, the population was 5,314. The county seat is Lumpkin. The county was created on December 23, 1830.

History
The area was inhabited by Native Americans for thousands of years in the Pre-Columbian period.  Roods Landing site on the Chattahoochee River is a significant archaeological site located south of Omaha.  Listed on the National Register of Historic Places, it includes major earthwork mounds built about 1100-1350 CE by peoples of the sophisticated Mississippian culture. Another Mississippian site is the Singer Moye Mounds, located in the southern part of the county.

The first Europeans to encounter the Native Americans were Spanish explorers in the mid-16th century.  At that time the historical Creek tribe inhabited the southern two thirds of what is now defined as Georgia, west of the Low Country. they are believed to be the descendants of the Mississippian culture.

They maintained their territory until after European American settlers arrived in increasing number in the early decades of the 19th century. The ensuing conflicts ultimately resulted in most of the Creek people's being driven out of the region. In the 1830s under Indian removal, the  US federal government forced most Creek to relocate west of the Mississippi River, to Indian Territory in what became present-day Oklahoma.

Stewart County was created by an act of the Georgia General Assembly on December 23, 1830, from land that had been part of Randolph County, Georgia. The county is named for Daniel Stewart, a Revolutionary War veteran, and fighter against American Indians. He was one of the four great-grandfathers of U.S. president Theodore Roosevelt.

Settlers developed the area as large cotton plantations, part of the "Black Belt" of Georgia and the Deep South. Before the American Civil War, planters depended on enslaved labor of thousands of African Americans to cultivate and process the cotton for market. Mostly born in the United States, the slaves were transported from the Upper South, with many families broken up when some members were purchased through sales in the domestic slave trade.

In 1850, the county reached its peak in wealth as one of the largest cotton producers in the state. It had the tenth-largest population of any county in the state, with 16,027 people. African-American slaves numbered 7,373, or 46% of the population.

By 1860, the county population was 13,422. The apparent drop was due to the counties of Kinchafoonee (later Webster County) and Quitman being created from Stewart County territory in 1853 and 1858, respectively. There were 5,534 slaves in the redefined Stewart County, constituting more than one-third of the population.

After the war and emancipation, cotton continued as the major commodity crop and additional territory was developed by planters for cultivation.  Many freedmen became sharecroppers and tenant farmers in the area, which was agricultural for decades, but in decline.  Stewart County lost its premier position when it was bypassed by developing railroads, which went to the north and south.  It did not have railroad access until 1885.

Inappropriate farming practices and over-cultivation of cotton from before the Civil War led to extensive land erosion by the early 20th century. Together with mechanization of agriculture and damage due to infestation by the boll weevil, there were losses in this part of the economy. Population declined. Up to the mid century, many blacks left the area in two waves of the Great Migration, seeking escape from Jim Crow conditions, and jobs and better lives in northern and midwestern industrial cities.  Farmers shifted to cultivating peanuts and later pine trees to reclaim and restore the land.  Population losses continued throughout the 20th century, as the forest and lumber industry did not require as many laborers.

In 1965, some of the towns in the county began to redevelop their historic properties to attract tourists and expand the economy. Lumpkin, Omaha and Louvale all had relatively intact historic properties and commercial districts. Green Grove is an historic African-American community established by freedmen after the Civil War. Stewart was the first rural county in the state to use historic preservation and Main Street redevelopment to support heritage tourism.

Geography
The county is mainly located in the upper Gulf coastal plain region of the state, with a few hills due to its close proximity to the fall line.

The vast majority of Stewart County is located in the Middle Chattahoochee River-Walter F. George Lake sub-basin of the ACF River Basin (Apalachicola-Chattahoochee-Flint River Basin). Just the very eastern edge of the county, bordered by a north-to-south line running through Richland, is located in the Kinchafoonee-Muckalee sub-basin of the same ACF Basin, with the very southeastern corner located in the Ichawaynochaway Creek sub-basin of the larger ACF River Basin.

Major highways

  U.S. Route 27
  U.S. Route 280
  State Route 1
  State Route 1 Connector
  State Route 27
  State Route 39
  State Route 39 Connector
  State Route 39 Spur
  State Route 520

Adjacent counties
 Chattahoochee County (north)
 Webster County (east)
 Randolph County (south)
 Quitman County (southwest)
 Barbour County, Alabama (west/CST Border)
 Russell County, Alabama (northwest/CST Border except for Phenix City as the city is jointed by the Columbus Metropolitan Area)

National protected area
 Eufaula National Wildlife Refuge (part)

Demographics

2020 census

As of the 2020 United States Census, there were 5,314 people, 1,816 households, and 1,138 families residing in the county.

2010 census
As of the 2010 United States Census, there were 6,058 people, 1,862 households, and 1,187 families living in the county. The racial makeup of the county was 47.3% black or African American, 28.0% white, 0.7% Asian, 0.2% American Indian, 22.8% from other races, and 1.0% from two or more races. Those of Hispanic or Latino origin made up 24.0% of the population. In terms of ancestry, 6.8% were English, 6.3% were German, and 4.9% were American.

Of the 1,862 households, 28.2% had children under the age of 18 living with them, 35.4% were married couples living together, 21.8% had a female householder with no husband present, 36.3% were non-families, and 32.2% of all households were made up of individuals. The average household size was 2.35 and the average family size was 2.97. The median age was 37.3 years.

The median income for a household in the county was $30,954 and the median income for a family was $41,673. Males had a median income of $29,936 versus $29,653 for females. The per capita income for the county was $15,612. About 18.5% of families and 24.2% of the population were below the poverty line, including 40.1% of those under age 18 and 20.2% of those age 65 or over.

2000 census
As of the census of 2000, there were 5,252 people, 2,007 households, and 1,348 families living in the county.  The population density was 11 people per square mile (4/km2).  There were 2,354 housing units at an average density of 5 per square mile (2/km2).  The racial makeup of the county was 61.54% Black or African American, 37.11% White,  0.25% Native American, 0.17% Asian, 0.11% from other races, and 0.82% from two or more races.  1.50% of the population were Hispanic or Latino of any race.

There were 2,007 households, out of which 27.70% had children under the age of 18 living with them, 39.50% were married couples living together, 23.10% had a female householder with no husband present, and 32.80% were non-families. 29.50% of all households were made up of individuals, and 14.50% had someone living alone who was 65 years of age or older.  The average household size was 2.48 and the average family size was 3.07.

In the county, the age distribution of the population shows 24.90% under the age of 18, 8.00% from 18 to 24, 25.30% from 25 to 44, 23.30% from 45 to 64, and 18.50% who were 65 years of age or older.  The median age was 39 years. For every 100 females, there were 91.50 males.  For every 100 females age 18 and over, there were 85.40 males.

The median income for a household in the county was $24,789, and the median income for a family was $29,611. Males had a median income of $27,568 versus $19,035 for females. The per capita income for the county was $16,071.  About 17.20% of families and 22.20% of the population were below the poverty line, including 30.40% of those under age 18 and 21.90% of those age 65 or over.

Parks and recreation
Florence Marina State Park and Providence Canyon State Park are located in Stewart County.

About  of the Eufaula National Wildlife Refuge are located along the Chattahoochee River's eastern shores in Stewart County. In addition, the Hannahatchee Wildlife Management Area is a  hunting preserve.

Communities
 Louvale
 Lumpkin
 Omaha
 Richland
 Florence
 Sanford
 Wrightsville

Politics
Sheriff Larry Jones is the Chief Law Enforcement Officer for this County.

Stewart County is reliably Democratic. In US presidential elections between 1880 and 2020 Stewart County has only voted Republican twice.

See also

 National Register of Historic Places listings in Stewart County, Georgia
List of counties in Georgia

References

Further reading
 Susan R. Boatright and Douglas C. Bachtel, eds., Georgia County Guide, Athens, GA: Center for Agribusiness and Economic Development, University of Georgia, annual.
 Helen Elisa Terrill, History of Stewart County, Georgia, ed. Sara Robertson Dixon, Columbus, Ga.: Columbus Office Supply, 1958.
 Helen Terrill and Sara Dixon, History of Stewart County, Georgia, vol. 1, Fernandina Beach, Fla.: Wolfe, 1998.
 William W. Winn, The Magic and Mystery of Westville, Lumpkin, Ga.: Westville Historic Handicrafts, 1999.

External links
 "Stewart County", New Georgia Encyclopedia
 Stewart County Georgia Community Web Pages

 
Georgia (U.S. state) counties
1830 establishments in Georgia (U.S. state)
Populated places established in 1830
Majority-minority counties in Georgia